Tennys Sandgren and Mikael Torpegaard were the defending champions but chose not to defend their title.

Julian Cash and Henry Patten won the title after defeating Charles Broom and Constantin Frantzen 6–2, 7–5 in the final.

Seeds

Draw

References

External links
 Main draw

Columbus Challenger II - Doubles